is a train station on the Hankyu Kyoto Main Line in Nagaokakyō, Kyoto, Japan, operated by the private railway operator Hankyu Railway. It opened on December 21, 2013, and is the 87th station operated by Hankyu Corporation.

Station layout
Nishiyama Tennozan Station is located under Kyoto Jūkan Expressway. The station has two side platforms serving two tracks.

Platforms

History
Nishiyama Tennozan Station opened on 21 December 2013. Station numbering was introduced to all Hankyu stations on this date with this station being designated as station number HK-76.

Surrounding area
 Kyoto Jūkan Expressway
 Suntory Kyoto Beer Factory
 Kyoto Prefectural Nishi-Otokuni Senior High School
 Nagaoka Healthcare Center
 Mount Tennōzan

Bus services

Kōsoku Nagaokakyō Bus Stop and Nishiyama Tennōzan Bus Terminal were opened with the opening of this station. The former is an expressway bus stop by an elevated highway (Kyoto-Jukan Expressway) and is accessed by elevators.

Hankyu Nishiyama Tennozan
Hankyu Bus
Route 1: for Kanegahara
Route 3: for JR Nagaokakyo via Tomooka and Hankyu Nagaoka-Tenjin
Route 5: for JR Nagaokakyo, Kofudai and Mitakedai
Route 6: for JR Nagaokakyo, Mitakedai and Kofudai
Route 7: for JR Nagaokakyo, Saiseikai Hospital and Mitakedai
Route 48: for Shin-Yamazakibashi via Obatabashi
Route 80: for JR Yamazaki via Saihoji, Emmyoji and Hankyu Oyamazaki / for Hankyu Higashi-Muko via Tomooka, Hankyu Nagaoka-Tenjin and JR Nagaokakyo 
Route 82: for Koizumibashi via Saihoji / for JR Nagaokakyo via Tomooka and Hankyu Nagaoka-Tenjin
Hankyu Bus and Keihan Bus
Route 90: for JR Nagaokakyo / for Keihan Yodo

Kōsoku Nagaokakyō
Hankyu Bus, Hankyu Kanko Bus, West JR Bus, Keisei Bus
Kobe, Osaka - Tokyo, Tokyo Disney Resort, Chiba
Osaka - Ina (Alpen Ina)
Osaka - Suwa (Alpen Suwa)
Tango - Kyoto
Osaka, Kyoto - Atsugi, Machida, Yokohama (Harbor Light, Youth Harbor Light)

References

External links

 Special website
 Nishiyama-tennozan Station from Hankyu Railway website

Railway stations in Kyoto Prefecture
Hankyu Kyoto Main Line
Railway stations in Japan opened in 2013